Jacqueline Coleman (born June 9, 1982) is an American educator and politician serving as the 58th lieutenant governor of Kentucky since 2019. She has worked as an administrator, high school teacher, and high school basketball coach. Coleman is also the founder and president of Lead Kentucky, a nonprofit organization focused on education policy reform. She is a member of the Democratic Party.

Early life and career
Coleman attended Mercer County High School in Harrodsburg, Kentucky, where she played basketball. She enrolled at Centre College to study history, earned a bachelor's degree in 2004, and played college basketball for the Centre Colonels. She earned a master's degree in political science at the University of Louisville in 2008, and was a graduate assistant on the Louisville Cardinals women's basketball team.

After graduating, Coleman became a social studies teacher at Burgin High School in Burgin, Kentucky, and coached the girls' basketball team. From 2008 through 2015, she coached and taught advanced government at East Jessamine High School in Nicholasville, Kentucky.

Coleman ran in a 2014 election to represent the 55th district in the Kentucky House of Representatives as a member of the Democratic Party. She lost the election to Kimberly King, a Republican, by over 30% in a traditionally Republican-dominated district. Specifically, there was no Democratic candidate to win a race in the 55th district that day.

In 2013, Coleman founded Lead Kentucky, a nonprofit organization focused on education policy reform. Inspired by Emerge Kentucky, the mission statement reads: "Lead Kentucky is a non-profit organization that recruits the best and brightest college women in the Bluegrass and empowers them to become the Commonwealth's next generation of leaders." By focusing on leadership development of college aged women through emphasis on networking, finding a work/life balance, and overcoming obstacles (specifically in Kentucky), Coleman hopes that this program will empower women to take on roles that they may otherwise avoid.

She became assistant principal at Nelson County High School in Bardstown, Kentucky in 2017, a position she held until her resignation in November 2019, following her election as lieutenant governor. Coleman is a doctoral student at the University of Kentucky, where she is studying educational leadership.

Lieutenant Governor of Kentucky

Elections 
2019 Kentucky Governor election
Andy Beshear selected Coleman as his running mate in the 2019 Kentucky gubernatorial election. On November 5, 2019, Beshear was declared the winner of the election, making Coleman the lieutenant governor-elect. After the election, Coleman said she would focus on education and rural economic development as lieutenant governor. In addition to serving as lieutenant governor, Beshear tapped Coleman to be the Secretary of Education and Workforce Development in his cabinet; though, she stepped down from this position in October 2021, saying that "seeing these commitments through requires a laser-like focus".

Tenure
Coleman and Beshear were sworn into office on December 10.

Personal life
Coleman's grandfather, Jack Coleman, played in the National Basketball Association. Her father, also named Jack, served in the Kentucky House, representing the 55th district from 1991 through 2004.

Coleman and her husband, Chris O'Bryan, announced her pregnancy during the 2019 campaign. Their daughter was born on February 8, 2020, making Coleman the highest ranking elected executive official and first lieutenant governor in Kentucky history to give birth while in office. Coleman also has another daughter, a former student she coached, whom she and O'Bryan adopted in December 2019, and is the stepmother to O'Bryan's two sons from a previous relationship.

See also
 List of female lieutenant governors in the United States

References

External links
 Official website of Lt. Gov. Jacqueline Coleman
 Beshear/Coleman campaign website

|-

|-

1982 births
21st-century American educators
21st-century American politicians
21st-century American women politicians
American educators
Centre Colonels women's basketball players
Kentucky Democrats
Kentucky women in education
Lieutenant Governors of Kentucky
Living people
Politicians from Danville, Kentucky
People from Harrodsburg, Kentucky
State cabinet secretaries of Kentucky
University of Louisville alumni
University of Kentucky alumni
Women in Kentucky politics
21st-century American women educators